John Hollander (October 28, 1929 – August 17, 2013) was an American poet and literary critic. At the time of his death, he was Sterling Professor Emeritus of English at Yale University, having previously taught at Connecticut College, Hunter College, and the Graduate Center, CUNY.

Life
Hollander was born in Manhattan, to Muriel (Kornfeld) and Franklin Hollander, Jewish immigrant parents. He was the elder brother of Michael Hollander (1934–2015), a distinguished professor of architecture at Pratt Institute. He attended the Bronx High School of Science and then Columbia College of Columbia University, where he studied under Mark Van Doren and Lionel Trilling, and overlapped with Allen Ginsberg (Hollander's poetic mentor), Jason Epstein, Richard Howard, Robert Gottlieb, Roone Arledge, Max Frankel, Louis Simpson and Steven Marcus. At Columbia, he joined the Boar's Head Society.  After graduating, he supported himself for a while writing liner notes for classical music albums before returning to obtain an MA in literature, and then a PhD from Indiana University.

Hollander resided in Woodbridge, Connecticut, where he served as a judge for several high-school recitation contests, and said he enjoyed working with students on their poetry and teaching it.   With his ex-wife, Anne Loesser (daughter of pianist Arthur Loesser; married 1953–77), he was the father of writer Martha Hollander and uncle of the songwriter Sam Hollander. He married Natalie Charkow in 1981.

Hollander died at Branford, Connecticut, on August 17, 2013, at the age of 83.

Poetic career
Hollander stressed the importance of hearing poems out loud: "A good poem satisfies the ear. It creates a story or picture that grabs you, informs you and entertains you". The poet needs to be aware of the "sound of sense; the music of speech". To Hollander, verse was a kind of music in words, and he spoke eloquently about their connection with the human voice.

Also known for his translations from Yiddish.
Hollander usually wrote his poems on a computer, but if inspiration struck him, he offered that, "I've been known to start poems on napkins and scraps of paper, too."

Hollander was considered to have technical poetic powers without equal, as exampled by his "Powers of Thirteen" poem, an extended sequence of 169 (13 × 13) unrhymed 13-line stanzas with 13 syllables in each line. These constraints liberated rather than inhibited Hollander's imagination, giving a fusion of metaphors that enabled Hollander to conceive this work as "a perpetual calendar". Hollander also composed poems as "graphematic" emblems (Type of Shapes, 1969) and epistolary poems (exampled in Reflections on Espionage, 1976), and, as a critic (in Vision and Resonance: Two Senses of Poetic Form, 1975), offered telling insights into the relationship between words and music and sound in poetry, and in metrical experimentation, and 'the lack of a theory of graphic prosody'.

Hollander influenced poets Todd LaRoche and Karl Kirchwey, who both studied under Hollander at Yale. Hollander taught Kirchwey that it was possible to build a life around the task of writing poetry. Kirchwey recalled Hollander's passion:
'Since he is a poet himself ... he conveyed a passion for that knowledge as a source of current inspiration.'

Hollander also served in the following positions, among others: member of the board, Wesleyan University Press (1959–62); editorial assistant for poetry, Partisan Review (1959–65) and a contributing editor, of Harper's Magazine (1969–71). and also commenced his other role as a poetry critic.

Hollander's poetry has been set to music by Milton Babbitt, Elliott Carter, and others; in 2007 he collaborated with the Eagles, allowing them use of his poem "An Old Fashioned Song" to create the song "No More Walks in the Wood".

Awards and honors
2006: Appointed Poet Laureate of the State of Connecticut (term ended in 2011)
2006: Robert Fitzgerald Prosody Award
2002: Philolexian Award for Distinguished Literary Achievement
1990: MacArthur Fellowship
1983: Bollingen Prize for Powers of Thirteen.
1979: elected a member of the American Academy of Arts and Letters Department of Literature
1958: Yale Series of Younger Poets for his first book of poems, A Crackling of Thorns, chosen by W. H. Auden.

Works
A Crackling of Thorns (1958) poems
The Untuning of the Sky (1961)
The Wind and the Rain (1961) editor with Harold Bloom
Movie-Going (1962) poems
Philomel (1964) "cantata text" for the composition of the same name by American composer Milton Babbitt
Visions from the Ramble (1965) poems
Jiggery-Pokery: A Compendium of Double Dactyls (1967) with Anthony Hecht
Types of Shape (1969, 1991) poems
Images of Voice (1970) criticism
The Night Mirror (1971) poems
Town and Country Matters (1972) poems
The Oxford Anthology of English Literature (1973), co-editor
The Head of the Bed (1974) poems
Tales Told of the Fathers (1975) poems
Vision and Resonance (1975) criticism
Reflections on Espionage (1976) poems
Spectral Emanations: New and Selected Poems (1978)
Blue Wine (1979) poems
The Figure of Echo (1981) criticism
Rhyme's Reason: A Guide to English Verse (1981, 1989, 2001, 2014) manual of prosody
Powers of Thirteen (1983) poems 
In Time and Place (1986) poems
Harp Lake (1988) poems
Melodious Guile: Fictive Pattern in Poetic Language (1988)
Some Fugitives Take Cover (1988) poems
The Essential Rossetti (1990), editor
Tesserae and Other Poems (1993)
Selected Poetry (1993)
American Poetry: The Nineteenth Century (1993), editor
Animal Poems (1994) poems
The Gazer's Spirit: Poems Speaking to Silent Works of Art (1995) criticism
Committed to Memory: 100 Best Poems to Memorize (1996), editor
The Work of Poetry (1997) criticism
The Poetry of Everyday Life (1998) criticism
Figurehead and Other Poems (1999) poems
Sonnets. From Dante to the present (2001), Everyman's library pocket poets.
Picture Window (2003)
American Wits: An Anthology of Light Verse (2003), editor
Poems Bewitched and Haunted (2005), editor
A Draft of Light (2008), poems
The Substance of Shadow: a Darkening Trope in Poetic History (2016), lectures

References

External links

Review of 'Stanley Cavell and the Claim of Reason'
 
Brief biography
John Hollander at Random House
Paul Devlin Interview with John Hollander
Curiosities - Quest of the Gole by Bud Webster at F&SF
Problems of Graphic order
John Hollander Papers. Yale Collection of American Literature, Beinecke Rare Book and Manuscript Library.

1929 births
2013 deaths
Members of the American Academy of Arts and Letters
American male poets
Bollingen Prize recipients
Formalist poets
Jewish American poets
American literary critics
Hunter College faculty
Graduate Center, CUNY faculty
Connecticut College faculty
Poets Laureate of Connecticut
Columbia College (New York) alumni
MacArthur Fellows
Poets from Connecticut
Poets from New York (state)
Yale Sterling Professors
Yale University faculty
Yale Younger Poets winners
20th-century American poets
20th-century American male writers
American male non-fiction writers
Anthologists